James Tandy may refer to:

 James Napper Tandy (1739–1803), member of the Society of United Irishmen
 James Tandy (public servant) (1918–1997), Australian public servant
 James Tandy (cricketer) (born 1981), English cricketer